The Socialist Unity League (LUS) is a small Trotskyist group in Mexico. It was formed in 1996 and is close to the US group Socialist Action and the German Revolutionary Socialist League. It is a member of the Socialist Alliance.

External links
 LUS web site

Far-left politics in Mexico
Fourth International (post-reunification)
National Political Associations in Mexico
Trotskyist organizations in Mexico